Bhalchandra Vaidya (22 June 1928 – 2 April 2018), also known as Bhai Vaidya, was an Indian politician who served as the Home Minister of the Indian state of Maharashtra, a revolutionary, Member of Legislative Assembly of the state of Maharashtra, Mayor of Pune city, veteran Socialist leader and head of the Socialist Party of India.

Brief biography
Bhai was born on 22 June 1928 at Dapode village in Velhe taluka, Poona District in a Marathi Chandraseniya Kayastha Prabhu (popularly known as CKP) family. He began his activism journey at the age of 14 as an Indian revolutionary. In his political career which spanned over 60 years, he was elected multiple times to the Municipal Corporation and later he became the Mayor of Pune city during 1974–75. He was the first president of All India Mayor Association. He was elected as the Member of the Maharashtra Legislative Assembly and later became the Home Minister of Maharashtra State in 1978.

He is well known for many reformative decisions during his Home Ministry, especially changing the police uniforms from half pants to full pants and refusing huge bribes from smugglers with his honest and uncompromising attitude. Bhai was at the forefront of the Samyukta Maharashtra Samiti movement with his mentor Shreedhar Mahadev Joshi and other influential leaders of the time.

Bhai was a vocal opponent of emergency even during his Mayorship, when he organised a rally of 20,000 people at Shaniwar Wada and got arrested. As a revolutionary and a life long activist who fought for the rights of Dalits, farmers and backward classes, Bhai was jailed 28 times.

Career 

He served as Home minister of state of Maharashtra, Mayor of Pune City, President of Socialist Party, President of Rashtra Seva Dal, National Secretary of Janata Party, National Chief of Samajwadi Jana Parishad, President of Bharat Yatra Trust, Delhi, President of S.M Joshi Medical Trust Pune, Pune Municipal Retirement Service home from 1995.

Death

Bhai Vaidya died from pancreatic cancer on 2 April 2018 at the age of 89. For last 10 years of his life he fought for free health and education. He is known as an honest politician and a fierce socialist leader/activist who never compromised on his morals and values during his career.

Chief minister Devendra Fadnavis said, “We have lost a person who believed in and lived for the democratic values all his life. He fought for the poor relentlessly. His contribution to the freedom movement and the Goa freedom movement is of immense importance. Vaidya’s dossiers on value and morale based politics are emblems. This is a big loss for the state.”

Prakash Javadekar, Union human resource development minister, recounted his recent meeting with Vaidya on Padwa. “He had come to meet me, to request that President should be invited for the inauguration of Ramabai Ambedkar’s statue. He was happy to know that the President was positive about the event,” he said, adding that Vaidya would always remember number by heart and would recount them in minutes when others struggled with directories.

References

1928 births
2018 deaths
Deaths from pancreatic cancer
Indian independence activists
Mayors of Pune
Members of the Maharashtra Legislative Assembly
People from Pune
Janata Party politicians